Embarcadero Plaza, previously known as Justin Herman Plaza from its opening in 1972 until 2017, is a  plaza near the intersection of Market and Embarcadero in San Francisco's Financial District, in the U.S. state of California. It is owned by Boston Properties, who acquired the neighboring Embarcadero Center office, hotel, and retail complex in 1998.

Design

The design of Embarcadero Plaza is credited to Don Carter (principal-in-charge) with help from Mario J. Ciampi and John Bolles. The original concept was devised by Lawrence Halprin, who described five distinct districts of Market Street in the 1962 report What to do About Market Street starting at the Embarcadero and ending at Van Ness. In retrospect, Halprin's vision for Market was described as a "pedestrian-oriented series of linked civic spaces" which were later realized as the open spaces running from Embarcadero Plaza (in the northeast) to UN Plaza in the southwest. Halprin described an early concept for what he called Ferry Building Park in the 1962 Market Street report, proposing to bring San Francisco Bay and the original harbor closer to Market, as "the [Embarcadero] Freeway and the Ferry building have created an impenetrable barrier, at street level, to one of San Francisco's most priceless assets – its marine setting" and offering ways to minimize the visual and aural impact of the double-decked freeway. 

The controversial Vaillancourt Fountain dominates the northeast end of the plaza. The large plaza could accommodate large crowds, and the roaring fountain was designed to drown out noise from the Embarcadero Freeway, which was completed in 1959 and ran along the east side of the plaza from its opening in 1972 until the freeway was torn down in 1991. La Chiffonnière is also installed in the plaza, closer to Market.

A bocce ball court was built using private donations in 2010.

Reception
During the debate over changing the name, San Francisco Chronicle urban spaces critic John King called it "a stark concrete landscape" and added "there's no earthly reason you would want to be there." In an earlier article published just after Halprin's death in 2009, King noted that Embarcadero Plaza was "oversize and stiff, unable to adjust to the changing urban scene on all sides."

History
The plaza, located at the eastern end of Market Street, opened in 1972. It was originally named for M. Justin Herman, executive director of the San Francisco Redevelopment Agency from 1959 to 1971.

In 2017, County Supervisor Aaron Peskin introduced a resolution to rename the site Embarcadero Plaza, citing Herman's role in displacing poor and minority residents from the Western Addition, Fillmore, Chinatown, and South of Market neighborhoods while presiding over the San Francisco Redevelopment Agency. The San Francisco Board of Supervisors passed the resolution unanimously on September 19, 2017. The name Embarcadero Plaza will be temporary until a new official name can be decided upon. The Board's resolution is nonbinding, as the authority to change the name rests with the San Francisco Recreation and Park Commission. Peskin stated he had received an unsolicited text from the owner, Boston Properties, which said they would cover the cost of replacing the plaque bearing Herman's name.

The Recreation & Parks Commission voted 4–2 to remove Justin Herman's name on November 16, 2017. An earlier vote in October ended in a 3–3 tie after one of the commissioners (who had favored removal of the name) left the meeting before the vote was held. David Johnson, a photographer who documented life in the Western Addition prior to SFRA's redevelopment, is a leading candidate for the renaming of the plaza.

Usage

The plaza is frequented by nearby office workers on lunch break and by families with small children. Free daytime concerts occur frequently in the summer, and an ice skating rink is set up for winter months. In 1987, during The Joshua Tree Tour, U2 held a free concert in Justin Herman Plaza to "Save the Yuppies" following the Black Monday financial crisis in October. During the finale of the impromptu concert, Bono spray-painted graffiti on Vaillancourt Fountain, for which he was fined.

During the early 1990s, the plaza was better known as EMB, one of the world's premier street skateboarding sites. Formal athletic ceremonies and rallies have also occurred in the plaza, including the retirement of Joe Montana (1995), attended by an estimated 25,000 people; the commemoration of Barry Bonds becoming the all-time home run leader (2007); and as the site of Super Bowl City, a "fan village" for attendees of Super Bowl 50 (2016) at Levi's Stadium in distant Santa Clara. Because of its size, the plaza is also frequently used for political rallies, including the Occupy San Francisco protest which took over the plaza for several months in 2011.

Recurring events
The monthly Critical Mass bicycle rides have started from the plaza since September 1992. Since 2006, on Valentine's Day, the plaza is the site of the Great San Francisco Pillow Fight, an unsponsored annual pillow fight flash mob.

References

External links

 
 
 

1972 establishments in California
Financial District, San Francisco
Squares in San Francisco